Udea schaeferi is a moth in the family Crambidae. It was described by Aristide Caradja in 1937. It is found in Yunnan, China.

References

schaeferi
Moths described in 1937